Döbling is the 19th District in the city of Vienna, Austria. It is located on the north end from the central districts, north of the districts Alsergrund and Währing. Döbling has some heavily populated urban areas with many residential buildings, and borders the Vienna Woods.
It hosts some of the most expensive residential areas such as Grinzing, Sievering, Neustift am Walde and Kaasgraben and is also the site of many Heurigen restaurants. There are also some large Gemeindebauten, including Vienna's most famous, the Karl-Marx-Hof.

Also located in Döbling is the American International School of Vienna, Lauder Business School and Q19 Shopping Center.

Geography

Location 
Döbling is located in the northwest of Vienna and spans the slope of the Wienerwald (Vienna Woods) to the Danube and the Donaukanal that make up the border of the district in the east. The Danube forms the border between Döbling and the district Floridsdorf, and the Canal forms the border to the district Brigittenau. At the Gürtel Bridge, crossing the Donaukanal, the district border turns southwest and separates Döbling in the south along Gürtel Road from the district Alsergrund. At Schrottenbachgasse the district turns towards the northwest and separates Döbling from the district Währing along the line Währinger Park–Hasenauerstraße–Peter-Jordan-Straße–Starkfriedgasse–Sommerhaidenweg. There is then a short stretch of border to the district Hernals at the edge of Vienna. In the northwest, the district borders on the municipality of Klosterneuburg, Lower Austria.

Space allocation 
Nearly 32.6% of the Döbling district area is building land (compared to Vienna citywide as 33.3%). Of this, 85.2% are made up of housing areas; the proportion of business areas, as 2.2% of the district area, is very low (Vienna 7.6%). With a greenspace share of 51.8% (48.3% for Vienna), Döbling is the fifth greenest district of Vienna. Agricultural land accounts for 14.9% of district land, with vineyards playing the biggest role around Grinzing, Nußdorf, Sievering, Neustift am Walde, and Salmannsdorf. Further 25.4% of the district is forested, plus 5.3% in meadows, 2.7% in small gardens, 2.5% in parks, and 0.9% as sports and recreational areas. Of the remaining district territory, 11.0% are traffic/transport areas and 4.6% bodies of water. While the proportion of water is higher in relation to the whole city of Vienna, the proportion of traffic is below.

Hills 
Since the Vienna Woods make up a large portion of Döbling, numerous forested hills of Vienna are located within the district limits. Many lie on the border with Lower Austria and the neighboring districts. The highest summit is Hermannskogel (542 m, 1778 ft;) with an outlook tower; however, the symbols of Döbling are Kahlenberg (484 m, 1588 ft) with an outlook and a radio mast, and nearby Leopoldsberg (427 m, 1401 ft). Other hills in this region are: Reisenberg, Latisberg, Vogelsangberg, Dreimarkstein, and Nussberg. Besides, there are hills in partially built-up areas in Döbling, such as Hohe Warte in Heiligenstadt, Hungerberg in Grinzing, and Hackenberg in Sievering.

Water bodies 
In the district zone, numerous streams originate, but now are mostly canalized or led underground in pipes.
Originally they all flowed, with the exception of the Waldbach (forest stream), into the Danube Canal. Because the catchment areas of the streams lie in the sandstone zone of the Viennese forest, the streams can and were able to swell to a multiple of their normal water quantity, leading again and again to destructive flood waters, especially along the Krottenbach. Krottenbach was the most important stream in Döbling, and is now almost entirely led in pipes. In the area behind Billrothstraße Federal Secondary School, it absorbs the Arbesbach (Erbsenbach) stream that runs through Sievering, in its upper reaches still flowing openly until Obersievering.

Nesselbach passes to the Krapfenwaldl openly, before it unites underground with the Reisenbergbach stream in Grinzing. Reisenbergbach stream passes openly until shortly before the center of Grinzing. Almost entirely in the open, the Schreiberbach stream passes up to Nußdorf, as does the Waldbach stream at Kahlenbergerdorf. 

The Döblinger Bach stream that originally sprang in the Cottage area and flowed into the Danube Canal at Spittelau has entirely disappeared because its water has been diverted.

District sectors 

Döbling was composed of these formerly independent municipalities:

History

Etymology 
Döbling was first mentioned in 1114 as "de Teopilic".
The name derives from the Slavic * topl’ika
("swampy waters" or "swampy place").<ref>
 Heinz D. Pohl:
 Slawische und slowenische (alpenslawische) Ortsnamen in Österreich .</ref>
The name "Döbling" relates to the lake of the Krottenbach stream,
while further possibility of interpretation derives from
Old Slavic Toplica ( "warm stream"). Later spellings of the place-name were for example Toblich, Töbling and Tepling. In the formation of the district 1890/92,
the name was finally "Döbling", from the largest municipality, Oberdöbling, in the incorporated district.

 Döbling in antiquity 
The district Döbling had been inhabited over 5,000 years ago, with the area Döbling–Nußdorf–Heiligenstadt (aside from the area Simmering-Landstraße) probably as oldest settlement area in the Vienna area. Known is that on the Leopoldsberg hill, an armed village with a fortified tower existed where the inhabitants of surrounding villages took refuge in the case of risk. About the residents of that time, little is known; science refers to them as members of "Donauländische" (Danube-land) culture. They, however, were not Indo-Germanic. Indo-european peoples penetrated into the Vienna area not until one thousand years later, where the resident population mixed with the immigrant Illyrians and Celtic people. 

In the last years of the 1st century BC, the Vienna area became part of the Roman Empire. Starting in 9 AD, it belonged to Pannonia province. The activities of the Romans, at the current site of Döbling, are documented by several findings, such as: in Heiligenstadt, a fortified tower of the limes (border wall); in Sievering, a Mithraeum temple was found; and excavations in Heiligenstadt's church revealed a Roman cemetery. In Sievering, a great quarry existed in Roman times, with a large worker settlement. 

A major source of subsistence of the population was wine growing, which presumably already had been done before the Romans arrived. Otherwise, the people practised agriculture for their own needs.

 Döbling in the Middle Ages 
After the Romans left, the further development of the villages in the area is in the dark. First mentions of the villages date back to the 12th century. Gradually, the later communities of Unterdöbling, Oberdöbling, Heiligenstadt, Nussdorf, Sievering, Kahlenbergerdorf, Josefsdorf, Salmannsdorf, and Neustift am Walde formed in the district area. There were also other settlements at times. In the 13th century there was a place called Chlaitzing (Glanzing) on the south-west slope of Hackenberg, about which only vineyards but no houses were mentioned in 1330. Along Hackhofergasse there was a small, one-line street village called Altes Urfar. Finally, there was even a place called Kogelbrunn on Hermannskogel in 1200, which was last mentioned in 1417.

 Döbling in the Modern Era 
The villages of Döbling were devastated several times during modern times. When the siege of Vienna by the army of Matthias Corvinus began in 1482, his soldiers also plundered the surrounding villages. In 1529, too, Turkish soldiers overran the villages of Döbling during the first Turkish siege of Vienna, killing numerous residents and kidnapping many as slaves. However, while the churches were looted, most of the villages survived. The Thirty Years' War also brought economic hardship. The slump in wine exports and the tax increases led to a severe impoverishment of the population. The great plague epidemic in 1679 claimed just as many victims in the villages as the second Turkish siege of Vienna that began in the summer of 1683. On July 13, the Ottoman vanguard, the Tatars, stormed and plundered the villages of Döbling. The liberation of Vienna was ultimately decided in the Battle of Kahlenberg on September 12, when the relief army, led by Jan Sobieski, advanced over the heights of the Vienna Woods in the rear of the Turkish besiegers.

In 1713 the plague came to Vienna again, with the towns of Sievering and Grinzing being particularly hard hit. While the numerous destructions and victims of the plague had hampered the development of the district area for a long time, a steady rise began in the second half of the 18th century. Due to the hilly terrain, large forested areas spread between the creeks and villages throughout the district, used as hunting grounds by the nobility. The topology also attracted wine growers. This combination increased the prosperity of the suburb, as noblemen built villas and hunting lodges whilst the burghers of Vienna relaxed at the Heurigen wine-gardens. The existing villages expanded, as the population increased. Oberdöbling in particular became attractive for the nobility and the Viennese citizens. Those who could afford it built a second home here. Similar to Hietzing, which benefited from its proximity to Schönbrunn Palace, the cornerstone for a special development of the suburb was laid here. Between 1765 and 1786, five new streets were built in Oberdöbling and four hunting lodges were built in what is now the area of the district.

The abolition of numerous orders by Joseph II also had an effect on the manors in Döbling. The confiscated assets of the Camaldolese (Kahlenberg), the Tulln nunnery (Oberdöbling) and the Gaming monastery (Untersievering) were used to set up the parishes of Nussdorf and Grinzing as well as the creation of the Döbling cemetery could be financed. The town of Josefsdorf also owes its existence to the abolition of the Camaldolese monastery on Kahlenberg. Through the parish reform of Joseph II, the parishes of Oberdöbling, Nussdorf and Neustift am Walde, which were now independent of Heiligenstadt, gained their independence.

 Döbling in the 19th century 
The Napoleonic Wars brought difficult times for the region. After the victory in the Battle of Ulm in 1805, the French army advanced to Vienna and the soldiers plundered the villages. Following the failed campaign against Bavaria, the French advanced again to Vienna in 1809, and so the communities were plundered again and had to feed the French soldiers. 

After the Congress of Vienna, the regular surveying of the Döbling area began. The operations lasted from 1817 to 1819 and ended with the introduction of the cadastral communities and the fixing of the borders between the localities. The growth now ensured an initial upswing in trade and industry in the rural villages. At the same time, the villages of Döbling became popular excursion destinations for the Viennese. Above all, the Heurigen inns and the Nussdorf brewery attracted visitors from Vienna and its suburbs. 

During the Revolutions of 1848 in the Austrian Empire, Döbling remained on the fringes of events. On October 20, 1848, the district area was occupied by imperial troops, who built a bridge across the Danube from Nussdorf and shelled the opposite bank. 

In the middle of the 19th century, the increasing popularity of summer resorts caused a real growth boom in the villages of Döbling. Due to the now additional need for living space, numerous residential buildings were built, and the population of the villages almost tripled within just forty years. This also led to a modernization of the infrastructure. The first gas lanterns were installed in Döbling in the mid-19th century, and the Döbling gasworks, built in 1856, supplied the area with gas.

 Döbling becomes a district of Vienna 
The 19th district of Vienna, Döbling, was founded at the end of the 19th century. While the suburbs of Vienna had already been incorporated in 1850, the discussion about the incorporation of the exurb localities also began in the 1870s. Although these towns opposed this step, the Landtag of Lower Austrian (the state parliament) decided to unify Vienna with its exurb areas after Emperor Franz Joseph I had announced this wish in 1888 in a speech that caused a stir in Währing. The corresponding law of December 19, 1890 was implemented by January 1, 1892 and united Unterdöbling, Oberdöbling, Grinzing (up to the crest of the Wienerwald, the rest becoming part of Weidling), Heiligenstadt, Nussdorf, Sievering, Kahlenbergerdorf (with the exception of the northern part of the mountain that was appended to Klosterneuburg), Josefsdorf and part of Weidling (Fischerhaus, Jägerwiese, Schutzhaus Hermannskogel) into the 19th district of Vienna. Due to the size of Oberdöbling, which had almost as many inhabitants as the rest of the district, there was no discussion about the name of the new district, Döbling. By that time, the places in the district had also largely grown together.

 Döbling up to Second World War 
The development of the area between Döbling and Währing had already begun in 1872. An elegant residential area emerged, the so-called first "Viennese Cottage". Döbling developed as a district for the prosperous middle and upper class. On the other hand, the area between Heiligenstädter Strasse and the Danube Canal was dedicated as an industrial area. By 1895, the canalisation of the Döbling streams was also completed. They no longer flowed into the Danube Canal, but into the main collection sewer, which ran parallel to the Danube Canal. The creeks now largely disappeared from the surface and were used as creek channels to improve the sewage system. After the completion of the Second Viennese spring water pipeline in 1910, most of the houses were also connected to the water pipeline. Previously people had only been supplied with water from wells and drinking water trucks.

The gas supply for the district area had already begun in 1856 through the ICGA gasworks, an English company. In 1911 the City of Vienna took over the supply and the works in Oberdöbling were demolished.

After the First World War, the creation of affordable and adequate living space became extremely important, which is why the city government—now dominated by the Social Democrats—began building cheap municipal housing in huge numbers throughout the city and also in Döbling. In 1923, the first municipal residential building (Gemeindebau) with 60 apartments was built in Schegargasse, and by 1930 the city had invested in the construction of 2,801 apartments. The largest and best-known project was Karl-Marx-Hof, stretching for 1.1 km (0.68 mi) between Heiligenstädter Strasse and Franz Joseph Railway. In addition, the Social Democrats tried to improve social welfare through numerous institutions.

Fighting during the February Uprising in 1934 was particularly heavy in the district. The main battle area was Karl-Marx-Hof. The building was shelled with artillery for two days, and three other municipal buildings were stormed by army forces. After the uprising was crushed, the Social Democratic Party was banned and the previously Social Democratic District Director of Döbling was removed from office.

In order to alleviate unemployment caused by the Great depression, the federal government began building Wiener Höhenstraße in 1934. The road led from Cobenzl to Kahlenberg and then to Klosterneuburg.

After National Socialist Germany had annexed Austria in March 1938, the district boundaries of Vienna were reorganized. This also affected Döbling, as Neustift am Walde with Glanzing and Salmannsdorf were transferred from Währing to Döbling.

Otherwise, however, the rule of the National Socialists primarily brought suffering to the approximately 4,000 Jews in Döbling (7% of the district population). During the November pogroms on November 10, 1938, the Döbling synagogue in Dollergasse 3 was destroyed. The 2,030 registered Jews remaining in Döbling in May 1939 were gradually deported to the concentration camps. During the war, around 5,000 people from Döbling had to enlist, and not much more than half of them returned.

Bombings in World War II hit the district area for the first time on July 8, 1944. 12% of the 20,960 homes were destroyed or made uninhabitable. The area around the train station in Heiligenstadt and Hohe Warte were particularly hard hit.

 Döbling after World War II 
On April 8, 1945, Soviet troops, coming from Klosterneuburg, invaded the district via Heiligenstädter Strasse and occupied it completely by April 9. Karl Mark was appointed first District Director of the Second Austrian republic by the army commander. During the following years, the district largely lost its character as a mix of residential areas and workplaces. More and more companies left the district, while the number of apartments rose from 20,000 after the end of the war to 39,608 apartments (2001). This development also meant that two thirds of the district population had to commute to work in other parts of the city or in the surrounding area.

The City of Vienna was also significantly active in construction work, building around 7,000 additional municipal flats by 1985. The largest municipal building of the post-war period in Döbling is Kopenhagen Hof ("Copenhagen courtyard") built between 1956 and 1959 on the former site of  Döbling brewery, housing 436 apartments. The Krim, part of Oberdöbling, also experienced a special boom. The once disreputable slum has been developed into a high-quality residential area with its own parish. Another important building is Pressehaus (press building) in Muthgasse, completed in 1963 (headquarters of Kronen Zeitung). The most important construction project at the moment is construction works on grounds around the Hohe Warte stadium.

In the 1990s, the district borders were changed twice: in 1995 concerning borders to the municipal districts of Hernals and Währing, and in 1996 to the district of Brigittenau. The latter border change meant an area gain for Döbling, which since then borders directly on the Danube Canal.

 Demography 

 Population development 
In 1832, 6,438 people lived in the district area. Due to the growth of the suburbs in the 19th century, the population doubled within 20 years and tripled by 1890. The number of residents continued to rise sharply until the First World War and after the war further increased due to the construction of municipal housing. Residential construction ensured growth in the district up until the 1980s. After that, the district population began to decrease slightly due to the increased housing needs until 2001, and since then has increased slightly again in the Vienna-wide trend, to 69,924 inhabitants at the beginning of 2015.

 Population structure 
The Döbling population is significantly older than the Viennese average. The proportion of people who are 60 years and older is very high at 29.9%; in the overall city area this proportion is only 22.2%. One reason for Döbling's aging population is the high proportion of retirement homes in Döbling. The proportion of women in the population is also above average at 55.1% (in Vienna it is only 52.4%).

 Origin and language 
The proportion of Döbling residents with foreign citizenship was 13.1% in 2003, around 4 percentage points below the Vienna average. 2% of Döbling residents were citizens of Serbia or Montenegro, 1.6% were German citizens. They are followed by Turks (1.2%) as well as Poles, Bosniaks, Croats, and Hungarians, but their share of the population is only between 0.5 and 0.3%. In total, around 20% of Döbling residents were born in another country in 2001, which is why only 82.8% of Döblingers said German was their everyday language. Another 2.8% spoke mainly Serbian, 1.6% Turkish, 1.2% Croatian, and 1.1% Hungarian.

 Religious preferences 
 
The distribution of religious preferences of the population in the 19th District, in 2001, differed most from the average in Vienna. With 55.7% of residents being Roman Catholic (Vienna: 49.2%), it is the second highest of all districts of Vienna. There are 11 districts of Roman Catholic parishes, which together constitute the City Deanery 19 (Stadtdekanat 19). Also, the percentage of people with Protestant religion reached 6.5%, as one of the highest portions among the districts in Vienna. The proportion of people adhering to Islam are 4.0%, and 3.2% for orthodoxy. About 23.8% said they had no religious denomination.

 Politics 

In the 2020 District Council elections (Bezirksvertretungswahl) the ÖVP won 36.9% of the vote. Second came the SPÖ, with 26.9%. The Greens won 16.0%, NEOS 9.8%, and the FPÖ 5.1%. Of the 48 seats in the District Council, ÖVP gained 19 seats, SPÖ 14, The Greens 8, NEOS 5, and FPÖ 2. Other parties won less than 2% each and gained no seats in the Council.

District Director is Daniel Resch, of ÖVP.

Education
The Japanische garden in Wien, the Japanese garden, is located in Döbling.

 Notable residents 

 Ludwig van Beethoven (1770–1827), composer (Grinzinger Straße 64; Pfarrplatz 2; Probusgasse 6 (the Heiligenstadt Testament was drafted here); Döblinger Hauptstraße 92 (Beethoven composed substantial parts of the Eroica Symphony here)
 Elias Canetti (1905–1994), writer, Nobel Prize in Literature 1981 (Himmelstraße 30)
 Kurt Gödel (1906–1978), Austrian-American mathematician, logician and philosopher (Himmelstraße 43)
 Mohamed ElBaradei (born 1942), former Director General of the International Atomic Energy Agency (IAEA), Nobel Peace Prize laureate
 Franz Grillparzer (1791–1872), poet (Grinzinger Straße 64)
 Bruno Kreisky (1911, Margareten, Vienna - 1990), former Chancellor of Austria (Armbrustergasse 15)
 Joseph Lanner (1801, Neubau, Vienna - 1843), composer (Gymnasiumstraße 87, building demolished in the late 19th century)
 Nikolaus Lenau (1802–1850), author
 Koloman Moser (1868, Wieden, Vienna - 1918), founding member of the Vienna Secession movement
 Helmut Qualtinger (1928, Alsergrund, Vienna - 1986), actor
 Romy Schneider (1938–1982), actress
 Johann Strauss I (1804–1849), composer (Dreimarksteingasse 13)
 Johann Strauss II (1825–1899), composer (Dreimarksteingasse 13)
 István Széchenyi (1791-1860), Hungarian politician (Oberdöbling asylum)
 Hussein bin Talal, King of Jordan (1935–1999)
 Ambros Rieder (1771–1855), composer, organist (born in Döbling) (de)
 Leon Trotsky (1879–1940), Marxist theorist and Bolshevik revolutionary (Rodlergasse 25)
 Franz Vranitzky (born 1937), former Austrian Chancellor
 Franz Werfel (writer) and his wife, Alma Mahler-Werfel
 Simon Wiesental (1908–2005), Nazi hunter
 Hugo Wolf (1860–1903), composer
 Hedwig “Hedy” Kiesler a/k/a Hedy Lamarr (born November 9, 1914; died January 19, 2000), actress, inventor (Peter-Jordan Strasse)

 Sights 
 Grinzing
 Karl-Marx-Hof

Sports
First Vienna F.C. are based in the district. Established on 22 August 1894, it is the country's oldest team and has played a notable role in the history of the game in Austria. They play at the Hohe Warte Stadium in Heiligenstadt, home of Vienna Vikings American football team.

 Notes 

 References 
 "Wien - 19. Bezirk/Döbling", Wien.gv.at, 2008, webpage (15 subpages): Wien.gv.at-doebling (in German).
 Werner Filek-Wittinghausen: Gut gewerkt in Döbling: Beiträge und Dokumente zur Wirtschaftsgeschichte ("Good work in Döbling: Articles and Documents on Economic History"). Bastei, Vienna 1984, .
 Christine Klusacek, Kurt Stimmer: Döbling. Vom Gürtel zu den Weinbergen ("Döbling: From the Belt to Weinberg Hill"). Vienna 1988, .
 Helmut Kretschmer: Wiener Bezirkskulturführer: XIX. Döbling ("Vienna District Cultural Leader: XIX. Döbling"). Jugend und Volk, Vienna 1982, .
 Carola Leitner (Hg.): Döbling: Wiens 19. Bezirk in alten Fotografien ("Döbling: Vienna's 19th District in Old Photographs"). Ueberreuter, Vienna 2006, .
 Godehard Schwarz: Döbling. Zehn historische Spaziergänge durch Wiens 19. Bezirk ("Döbling: Ten Historic Walking Tours through Vienna's 19th District"). Vienna 2004, .
 Franz Mazanec: Wien-Döbling. Frühere Verhältnisse. Sutton, Erfurt 2005. .

 External links 
  Bezirksmuseum Döbling
  Döbling-Wien
  wien.at - 19. Bezirk/DöblingThis article includes information translated from the German-language Wikipedia article :de:Döbling.''

 
Districts of Vienna